Dietrich IV was Count of Cleves from 1188 through 1198.

The County of Cleves was a comital polity of the Holy Roman Empire in present Germany (part of North Rhine-Westphalia) and the Netherlands (parts of Limburg, North Brabant and Gelderland). Its rulers, called counts, had a special and privileged standing in the Empire. The County of Cleves  was first mentioned in the 11th century. In 1417, the county became a duchy, and its rulers were raised to the status of Dukes.

Its history is closely related to that of its neighbours: the Duchies of Jülich, Berg and Guelders and the County of Mark. In 1368, Cleves and Mark were united. In 1521 Jülich, Berg, Cleves and Mark formed the United Duchies of Jülich-Cleves-Berg.  The territory was situated on both sides of the river Rhine, around its capital Cleves and roughly covering today's districts of Cleves, Wesel and the city of Duisburg.

He married Margaret, daughter of Floris III, Count of Holland, and his wife Ada of Huntingdon.

According to the German, Dutch and French Wikipedia there was only one Dietrich between 1172 and 1198. This Dietrich was the son of Dietrich II and Adelaide of Sulzbach and was married to Margaret of Holland. This would make Dietrich III and Dietrich IV the same person.

Counts of Cleves